Kerkrade Centrum is a railway station in Kerkrade, the Netherlands. The station was built in 1933 on the Schaesberg–Simpelveld railway and is the eastern terminus of the Heuvellandlijn (Maastricht–Kerkrade). However, as the Dutch Railways deemed it unprofitable at the time, the station did not see passenger services until 15 May 1949, when regular passenger services finally commenced on the Schaesberg–Simpelveld railway. Train services were operated by Veolia until 11 December 2016, when Arriva took over.

The station is about 200 m north of the German border.

The station is also served by the ZLSM heritage steam train to Schin op Geul and Simpelveld as well as Germany.

Train services
The following local train services call at this station:
Stoptrein S3: Sittard–Heerlen–Kerkrade

Bus services 
, the following buses call at Kerkrade Centrum's bus stop:
 20: Kerkrade–Parkstad Limburg Stadion––Brunssum–Schinveld (Arriva)
 34: Kerkrade–Kohlscheid–Aachen

References

External links 
NS website 
Dutch public transport travel planner

Railway stations in Kerkrade
Railway stations opened in 1933
Railway stations closed in 1934
Railway stations opened in 1949
Railway stations on the Heuvellandlijn